Li Yutang was a KMT general from Guangrao County, Shandong. Li Yutang was a prominent member of the Hong Kong branch of the Tongmenghui (Chinese Revolutionary Alliance) in the late Qing dynasty. In 1937, he participated in the Battle of Shanghai as commander of the 3rd Division. In 1945, he fought in the Zhijiang Campaign, also known as the Battle of Xuefeng Mountains, in western Hunan.

References

National Revolutionary Army generals from Shandong
People from Dongying
1899 births
1951 deaths
People executed by Taiwan by firearm